The Butler River is a river of New Zealand.

See also
List of rivers of New Zealand

References
Land Information New Zealand - Search for Place Names

Rivers of the West Coast, New Zealand
Rivers of New Zealand